Gluta usitata, previously known as Melanorrhoea usitata, is an Asian tree species in the family Anacardiaceae.  It may be known as Burmese lacquer, theetsee, thitsi or ringas.

It has been identified as an endangered species in Viet Nam, where it may be called sơn đào.

Description
It is a medium to large deciduous tree from the dry deciduous forest with a straight clean cylindrical bole and a spreading crown of dark green leaves.

This species is used in Burma and northern Thailand as a source of lacquer used for producing varnish, waterproof or preservative paint, glue, ceramic and lacquerware. Timber (known as Borneo rosewood) is used for furniture and inlay work.

The tree's sap and sawdust can cause dermatitis and skin irritation.

An incompletely identified 4-heptadec(en)yl catechol, which was named thitsiol, has been reported to occur in this species. Sap also contains urushiol.

References

External links
 
 Type specimen of Melanorrhoea usitata
 Isotype

Anacardiaceae
Plants described in 1829
Flora of Vietnam
Flora of Myanmar
Flora of Thailand
Lacquerware